Café Flesh is a 1982 post-apocalyptic cult pornographic science fiction film designed and directed by Stephen Sayadian (under the pseudonym "Rinse Dream") and co-written by Sayadian and Jerry Stahl (credited as "Herbert W. Day"). Music was composed and produced by noted music producer Mitchell Froom (and later appeared in his album, Key of Cool).

Two sequels, Café Flesh 2 and Café Flesh 3, were released in 1997 and 2003, without the participation of the original creators. The sequels were written and directed by Antonio Passolini and did not have the same degree of popularity and cult appeal as the first film.

Plot 
In the aftermath of nuclear apocalypse, 99% of the survivors are sex Negatives – they become violently ill if they attempt to have sex. The minority sex Positives are forced to engage in carnal theater for the entertainment of the Negatives at Café Flesh. Everyone is excited about the arrival at the club of the famous Positive Johnny Rico, and one Negative woman is beginning to question her negativeness as she and her boyfriend grow more distant from each other.

History
By the early 1970s, the pornographic film industry had gained popularity, through the success of films such as Behind the Green Door and Deep Throat. During this period, there were many attempts to create artistic pornography, including The Devil in Miss Jones. There were also non-pornographic films with hardcore sex, such as I Am Curious (Yellow) and In the Realm of the Senses. By the early 1980s, home video technology shifted the porn industry, and pornography theaters were becoming less successful.

In 1982, Café Flesh, which mixed sex, satire, and avant-garde theater, was released. The film was created and co-written by Stephen Sayadian, under the name "Rinse Dream", and journalist Jerry Stahl, under the name "Herbert W. Day". Sayadin and Stahl made the film in two separate parts, using the non-pornographic elements of the film to attract financiers.

Two actors involved in this film went on to notable work in mainstream productions. Lead actress Michelle Bauer, using the name Pia Snow in this film, became a prolific B-movie actress. Richard Belzer, a noted comedian at the time who later became known for his role as John Munch in Homicide: Life on the Street and Law & Order: Special Victims Unit, appears as an audience member, but does not appear in any of the sexual scenes.

Criticism

Scholar Bradford K. Mudge has said of Café Flesh, that it, "Like all great satire...stands in parodic opposition to the very generic forms out of which it evolved. Its brilliance results from a bifurcated vision: it dramatizes at once the death of pornography and its disturbing resurrection as culture itself. In so doing, the film marks a juncture—historically arbitrary to be sure—when 'pornography' is finally capable of critical self-reflection, capable of seeing its own 'imagination' as distinct from but integral to both its aesthetic predecessors and its larger cultural environment."

Awards
Café Flesh won the 1984 AVN Award for Best Art Direction - Film and has been inducted into the XRCO Hall of Fame. Café Flesh 2 won the 1998 XRCO Award for Best Video and the 1999 AVN Award for Best Video Feature and Best Special Effects.

References

External links
 
 
 
 
 Review of the film
 "Cafe Flesh" by Molly Case, SexyFandom, November 12, 2004
 
 
 
 
 
 

1980s pornographic films
1980s science fiction films
1982 films
Films about nuclear war and weapons
Films set in the future
American post-apocalyptic films
American satirical films
Films with screenplays by Jerry Stahl
AVN Award winners
1980s English-language films
1980s American films